Garth John da Silva (born 28 December 1973 in Wellington, New Zealand) is a boxer from New Zealand, who competed at the 1996 Summer Olympics in Atlanta, Georgia. There he won his first round in the Heavyweight (-91 kg) division against Cathel O'Grady of Ireland, before losing to Serguei Dychkov of Belarus. In 1998 he won the bronze medal at the 1998 Commonwealth Games in Kuala Lumpur. He is the son of wrestler John da Silva.

References

1973 births
Living people
Heavyweight boxers
Olympic boxers of New Zealand
Boxers at the 1996 Summer Olympics
Commonwealth Games bronze medallists for New Zealand
Boxers at the 1998 Commonwealth Games
New Zealand male boxers
People educated at Rutherford College, Auckland
Commonwealth Games medallists in boxing
Medallists at the 1998 Commonwealth Games